Blaine Pedersen is a politician in Manitoba, Canada.  He was elected to the Legislative Assembly of Manitoba in the 2007 provincial election for the electoral division of Carman.  Pederson is a member of the Progressive Conservative Party.

Pedersen was re-elected in the new Midland riding in the 2011, and 2016 elections. On May 3, 2016, Pedersen was appointed to the Executive Council of Manitoba as Minister of Infrastructure.

On August 17, 2017, he was named Minister of Growth, Enterprise and Trade.

Re-elected in the 2019 election, he announced on July 15, 2021, that he was resigning from cabinet and did not intend to seek re-election.

Electoral results

References

Living people
Progressive Conservative Party of Manitoba MLAs
Members of the Executive Council of Manitoba
Canadian people of Danish descent
21st-century Canadian politicians
Year of birth missing (living people)
Place of birth missing (living people)